Tetsuji Fukushima (February 19 1914-1992) was a Japanese manga artist.

Fukushima was born in the Fukushima Prefecture. From January 1949 to February 1956, his science fiction comic series Sabaku no Maō appeared in the Bōken Ō magazine by Akita Shoten. He was inspired for this manga by the Middle Eastern tale of Aladdin and the Magic Lamp. Sabaku no Maō was also published in nine anthologies after the magazine publication. The manga's drawing style was influenced by American comics, which the editor of magazine had bought from the occupation army and given to Fukushima as a reference.

Hayao Miyazaki cited an episode in Sabaku no Maō as a great inspiration for his film The Castle in the Sky: "As a student, I read it [Sabaku no Maō] over and over again with a beating heart. There was an episode about a gemstone that gave you the power to fly. I was so moved by it that I wanted to make a film about a magic stone.“

Fukushima's other works include Inazuma Dōji (1954), Kaijin Z and Shippū Kenshi (1956–1957).

External links 

 Fukushima Tetsuji on Lambiek Comiclopedia

References 

1992 deaths
1914 births
Japanese people
Manga artists from Fukushima Prefecture